William Lewis Evans (29 November 1897 – 25 April 1966) was an English first-class cricketer and civil servant.

Evans was born at Streatham. He first joined the Civil Service in January 1913 as a clerk, later transferring to the Office of Works in May 1920. Evans represented the Civil Service cricket team in its only appearance in first-class cricket against the touring New Zealanders at Chiswick in 1927. Batting twice during the match, he scored 8 runs in the Civil Service first-innings before being dismissed by Curly Page, while in their second-innings he ended not out on 15. He bowled seventeen wicketless overs in the New Zealanders only innings, conceding 52 runs. 

By 1937, he was employed as a clerk in the Inland Revenue. He died at Epsom in April 1966.

References

External links

1897 births
1966 deaths
People from Streatham
English civil servants
English cricketers
Civil Service cricketers